Hover flies, also called flower flies or syrphid flies, make up the insect family Syrphidae. As their common name suggests, they are often seen hovering or nectaring at flowers; the adults of many species feed mainly on nectar and pollen, while the larvae (maggots) eat a wide range of foods. In some species, the larvae are saprotrophs, eating decaying plant and animal matter in the soil or in ponds and streams. In other species, the larvae are insectivores and prey on aphids, thrips, and other plant-sucking insects.

Insects such as aphids are considered a crop pest, and therefore the aphid-eating larvae of some hover flies serve as an economically (as well as ecologically) important predator and even potential agents for use in biological control, while the adults may be pollinators.

About 6,000 species in 200 genera have been described. Hover flies are common throughout the world and can be found on all continents except Antarctica. Hover flies are harmless to most mammals, though many species are mimics of stinging wasps and bees, a mimicry which may serve to ward off predators.

Description

The size of hover flies varies depending on the species. Some, such as members of the genus Baccha, are small, elongated, and slender, while others, such as members of Criorhina, are large, hairy, and yellow and black. As members of the Diptera, all hover flies have a single functional pair of wings (the hind wings are reduced to balancing organs). Many species are brightly colored, with spots, stripes, and bands of yellow or brown covering their bodies. Due to this coloring, they are often mistaken for wasps or bees; they exhibit Batesian mimicry. Despite this, hover flies are harmless to humans. Drone flies, E. tenax, are an example of a species of hover fly who exhibit Batesian mimicry. 

With a few exceptions, hover flies are distinguished from other flies by having a spurious vein, located parallel to their fourth longitudinal wing vein. Adults feed mainly on nectar and pollen. Many species also hover around flowers, lending to their common name.

Bee flies of the family Bombyliidae often mimic  Hymenoptera and hover around flowers, as well, rendering some bombyliid species hard to tell apart from Syrphidae at first glance. Hover flies can, nevertheless, be distinguished in the field by anatomical features such as:

 The legs and mouthparts of hover flies are usually not particularly long and thin (some bombyliids have a long and needle-like proboscis, many have legs that are noticeably longer and thinner than in similar-sized syrphids)
 Their facial cuticle often has prominent bulges and/or beak- to knob-like projections (most bee flies have an evenly curved or sloping face).
 The wings are often clear or have smooth gradients of tinting, and their veins merge posteriorly into a "false edge" that runs parallel to the wing's true rear edge and extends along half or more of the wing length (bombyliid wings lack a "false rear edge" and often have large dark areas with sharp boundaries, or complex patterns of spots).
 Their abdomens and thoraces often have glossy cuticular body surfaces, abdominal colors are usually mainly due to cuticular pigments (bee flies are usually very hairy, their abdominal colors are almost always due to pigmentation of hairs and not the underlying cuticle).

Reproduction and life cycle

Unlike adults, the maggots of hover flies feed on a variety of foods; some are saprotrophs, eating decaying plant or animal matter, while others are insectivores, eating aphids, thrips, and other plant-sucking insects. Predatory species are beneficial to farmers and gardeners, as aphids destroy crops, and hover fly maggots are often used in biological control.  This includes one of the most common widespread hover fly species, Episyrphus balteatus, whose larvae feed on aphids. Certain species, such as Merodon equestris or Eumerus tuberculatus, are responsible for pollination.

An example of a well-known hover fly maggot is the rat-tailed maggot, of the drone fly, Eristalis tenax. It has a breathing siphon at its rear end, giving it its name. The species lives in stagnant water, such as sewage and lagoons. The maggots also have a commercial use, and are sometimes sold for ice fishing.

On extremely rare occasions, hover fly larvae have been known to cause accidental myiasis in humans. This occurs when the larvae are accidentally ingested from contaminated food.

Evolution 
The oldest known fossils of crown group Syrphidae are from the Eocene aged Florissant Formation, Green River Formation and Baltic amber. However, the genus Prosyrphus from the Late Cretaceous (Cenomanian) aged Burmese amber appears to represent a stem group to the family.

Distribution and habitat
Hover flies are a cosmopolitan family found in most biomes, except extreme deserts, tundra at extremely high latitudes, and Antarctica. Certain species are more common in certain areas than others; for example, the American hoverfly, Eupeodes americanus, is common in the Nearctic realm, and the common hoverfly, Melangyna viridiceps, is common in the Australasian realm. About 6,000 species and 200 genera are in the family.

While some hover fly larvae are aquatic and are often found in stagnant water, those of species that prey upon aphids and other plant parasites are usually terrestrial, residing on leaves. Adults are often found near flowers, their principal food source being nectar and pollen. Some species are found in more unusual locations; for example, members of the genus Volucella can be found in bumblebee nests, while members of Microdon are myrmecophiles, found in ant or termite nests. Others can be found in decomposing vegetation.

Pollination

Hover flies are important pollinators of flowering plants in many ecosystems worldwide. Syrphid flies are frequent flower visitors to a wide range of wild plants, as well as agricultural crops, and are often considered the second-most important group of pollinators after wild bees. However, relatively little research into fly pollinators has been conducted compared with bee species. Bees are thought to be able to carry a greater volume of pollen on their bodies, but flies may be able to compensate for this by making a greater number of flower visits.

Like many pollinator groups, syrphid flies range from species that take a generalist approach to foraging by visiting a wide range of plant species through those that specialize in a narrow range of plants. Although hover flies are often considered mainly nonselective pollinators, some hover flies species are highly selective and carry pollen from one plant species. Cheilosia albitarsis is thought to only visit Ranunculus repens.

Specific flower preferences differ among species, but syrphid fly species have repeatedly been shown to prefer white- and yellow-coloured flowers. Nonvisual flower cues such as olfactory cues also help these flies to find flowers, especially those that are not yellow. Many syrphid fly species have short, unspecialized mouth parts and tend to feed on flowers that are more open as the nectar and pollen can be easily accessed.

Also, a number of fascinating interactions occur between orchids and hover flies. The orchid species Epipactis veratrifolia mimics alarm pheromones of aphids which attracts pollinating hover flies . Another plant, the slipper orchid in southwest China, also achieves pollination by deceit by exploiting the innate yellow color preference of syrphids.

Case study – New Zealand

More than 40 species of syrphid flies are found in New Zealand in a variety of habitats, including agricultural fields and alpine zones. Two hover fly species in Switzerland are being investigated as potential biological control agents of hawkweeds in New Zealand.

Native hover fly species Melanostoma fasciatum and Melangyna novaezelandiae are common on agricultural fields in New Zealand. Coriander and tansy leaf are particularly attractive to many species of adults, which feed on their pollen. In organic paddocks, hover flies were found to feed on an average of three and a maximum of six different pollens. M. fasciatum has a short proboscis, which restricts it to obtaining nectar from disk flowers.

Syrphid flies are also common visitors to flowers in alpine zones in New Zealand. Native flies (Allograpta and Platycheirus) in alpine zones show preferences for flower species based on their colour in alpine zones; syrphid flies consistently choose yellow flowers over white regardless of species. However, syrphid flies are not as effective pollinators of alpine herb species as native solitary bees.

Systematics

Relationship with humans
Syrphid flies offer dual services to humans, with adults pollinating and larvae providing other services.

Larvae of many hover fly species prey upon pest insects, including aphids and leafhoppers, which spread some diseases such as curly top, so they are seen in biocontrol as a natural means of reducing the levels of pests. Gardeners, therefore, sometimes use companion plants to attract hover flies. Those reputed to do so include Alyssum spp., Iberis umbellata, statice, buckwheat, chamomile, parsley, and yarrow. Larvae in the subfamily Eristalinae live in semi-aquatic and aquatic environments, including manure and compost, and can filter and purify water. 

 book The Fly Trap concerns his enthusiasm for hover flies on the island of Runmarö in the Baltic Sea. The island is a hotspot for hover flies and other insects; Sjöberg has collected 58 species of butterflies there, and (in seven years of hunting) 202 species of hover flies, including 180 in his garden.

Identification guides
 Skevington, J.H., et al., 2019. Field Guide to the Flower Flies of Northeastern North America. Princeton University Press . This book "covers all 413 known syrphid species that occur in or north of Virginia, Kentucky, and Missouri, west to include Iowa, Minnesota, Ontario, and Nunavut, and east to the Atlantic Ocean, including Greenland."
Stubbs, A.E. and Falk, S.J. (2002) British Hoverflies An Illustrated Identification Guide. Pub. 1983 with 469 pages, 12 col plates, b/w illus. British Entomological and Natural History Society . 276 species are described with extensive keys to aid identification. It displays 190 species on colour plates. 2nd edition, pub. 2002, includes new British species and name changes. It includes European species likely to appear in Britain. Additional black and white plates illustrate the male genitalia of the difficult genera Cheilosia and Sphaerophoria.
 van Veen, M.P. (2004) Hoverflies of Northwest Europe: Identification Keys to the Syrphidae. KNNV Publishing, Utrecht .
 Miranda G.F.G., Young A.D., Locke M.M., Marshall S.A., Skevington J.H., Thompson F.C. (2013) Key to the Genera of Nearctic Syrphidae.

Regional lists
 List of hoverfly species of Great Britain
 List of the Syrphidae of Ireland
 List of flower flies of New Zealand
 List of the flower flies of North America
 Syrphidae of New York State

References

External links
 Hoverfly – index to scholarly articles
 All About Hoverflies
 A website about Dutch hoverflies

 Hoverfly Recording Scheme – UK Dipterists Forum

 Syrphidae species in Europe and Africa, with photos, range maps, checklists and literature
 Diptera.info Picture Gallery

Species lists
 Nearctic at nearctica.com
 West Palaearctic including Russia at faunaeur.org
 Australasian/Oceanian at bishopmuseum.org
 List of the flower flies of North America
 List of hoverfly species of Great Britain
 Syrphidae of New York State
 List of flower flies of New Zealand